The Hussar Captain or Captain of the Hussars (Italian: Il capitano degli ussari) is a 1940 Italian comedy film directed by Sándor Szlatinay and starring Clara Tabody, Enrico Viarisio and Pina Gallini.

It was made at the Fert Studios in Turin. The film's sets were designed by Alfredo Montori. A separate Hungarian version was also produced.

Cast
 Clara Tabody as La ballerina  
 Enrico Viarisio as Varady, ex-capitano degli ussari  
 Paolo Viero as Suo figlio  
 Pina Gallini as La prima zia  
 Lola Braccini as La seconda zia  
 Jone Romano as La zitella 
 Arturo Bragaglia 
 Livia Minelli 
 Luigi Pavese 
 Carlo Romano
 Aroldo Tieri

References

Bibliography 
 Poppi, Roberto. I film: Tutti i film italiani dal 1930 al 1944. Gremese Editore, 2005.

External links 

1940 films
1940s multilingual films
Italian comedy films
1940 comedy films
1940s Italian-language films
Italian multilingual films
Italian black-and-white films
1940s Italian films